Malcolm's worm snake (Indotyphlops malcolmi) is a species of snake in the family Typhlopidae.

Etymology
The specific name, malcolmi, is in honor of British herpetologist Malcolm Arthur Smith.

Geographic range
It is endemic to Sri Lanka.

References

Further reading
Hedges SB, Marion AB, Lipp KM, Marin J, Vidal N. 2014. "A taxonomic framework for typhlopid snakes from the Caribbean and other regions (Reptilia, Squamata)". Caribbean Herpetology (49): 1-61. (Indotyphlops malcolmi, new combination).
Taylor EH. 1947. "Comments on Ceylonese Snakes of the Genus Typhlops with Descriptions of New Species". Univ. Kansas Sci. Bull. 31 (13): 283–298. (Typhlops malcolmi, new species, pp. 291–292).

Indotyphlops
Reptiles described in 1947